Raigarh railway station is a main railway station in Raigarh district, Chhattisgarh. Its code is RIG. It serves Raigarh city and surrounding area like Ambikapur, Surguja, Dharamjaigarh, and Sarangarh where rail network is not there. The station consists of three platforms. The platforms are well sheltered. It lacks many facilities including water and sanitation. The station lies on Tatanagar–Bilaspur section of Howrah–Nagpur–Mumbai line the broad-gauge line and comes under Bilaspur railway division of SECR zone. Gondwana Express

Major trains 

 RKMP–Santragachi Humsafar Express 
 Azad Hind Express
 Bhubaneswar–Mumbai LTT Superfast Express
 Shalimar–Bhuj Weekly Superfast Express
 Bilaspur–Tatanagar Passenger
 Bilaspur–Jharsuguda Passenger (unreserved)
 Bilaspur–Raigarh MEMU
 Bilaspur–Patna Weekly SF Express
 Gitanjali Express 
 Gondia–Jharsuguda Passenger (unreserved)
 Raigarh–Gondia Jan Shatabdi Express
 Hazart Nizamuddin–Raigarh Gondwana Express
 Hatia–Mumbai LTT Superfast Express
 Hirakud Express
 Howrah–Ahmedabad Superfast Express 
 Howrah Mumbai Mail (via Nagpur) 
 Shalimar–Hapa–Okha Express 
 Shalimar–Porbandar SF Express
 Itwari–Tatanagar Jn Passenger
 Kalinga Utkal Express 
 Kamakhya–Mumbai LTT Karmabhoomi Express
 Lokmanya Tilak Terminus–Puri Superfast Express
 Shalimar–Lokmanya Tilak Terminus Samarsata Express
 Puri–Jodhpur Express
 Shalimar–Udaipur City Weekly Express
 South Bihar Express
 Bikaner-Puri Express

References

Railway stations in Raigarh district
Bilaspur railway division